Alejandro Antonio Betances Taveras (born October 9, 1953) is a former infielder in Major League Baseball. He played in 35 games over three seasons (1976, 1982–1983) for the Houston Astros and Los Angeles Dodgers.

Alex has three sons Alex jr, Smil, and Joshua . Taveras is a coach for the Aguilas Cibaenas of the Dominican Winter League

External links

1955 births
Águilas Cibaeñas players
Albuquerque Dukes players
Buffalo Bisons (minor league) players
Cedar Rapids Astros players
Charleston Charlies players
Columbus Astros players
Dominican Republic expatriate baseball players in the United States
Houston Astros players
Iowa Oaks players

Living people
Los Angeles Dodgers players
Major League Baseball infielders
Major League Baseball players from the Dominican Republic
Memphis Blues players
Minor league baseball managers
San Antonio Dodgers players